Madras curry or Madras sauce is a fairly hot curry sauce (with the exception of seafood madras curries, which are made to a slightly different recipe), orange in colour and with heavy use of chili powder. Raita is often used as an accompaniment to the dish.

Origins
Madras curry is said to originate from the south of India, and gets its name from the city of Madras (now Chennai).

Variations
There are many variations on Madras curry and cooking in India is more a domestic practice than a cuisine governed by the conventions of chefs, restaurants, or texts. This curry can be vegetarian or made with meat. Availability of local or locally available ingredients is central to regional Indian foods. The result of the signatures of Madras curries can be achieved through different means; the result often being that of: red colour; toasty spices; the sour-sweet fruitiness of tamarind; a slight liquorice flavour of anise; ginger; a range of other spices (sweet and savoury and earthy) and the flavours of salt, sweet and sour. The redness is achieved with chilli or a mixture of chilli and paprika, and the orange of turmeric. Additional sourness may be had from lemon, lime or vinegar.

The spices are complementary to the savoury flavours, which may include garlic and possibly onion or asafoetida. Garam masala, coriander, and black peppercorns may also be part of the spice mixture.

Common ingredients may also include fresh curry leaves, and the final addition of fresh coriander.

The variations include the roasting of many of the spices including dried chillis, coriander seed, aniseed, cumin and cinnamon. This can be done in an oven for 10 minutes at 180 °C, or in a frying pan with no oil at low heat. A basic spice mix for Madras curry can be made when these dried roasted ingredients are ground in a mortar and pestle or coffee grinder and mixed with turmeric and stored in readiness for use.

Variations are also related to means of storage. The primary spice ingredients can be stored as; roasted dried ground powder; a paste of dried ingredients with vinegar; an oil spice infusion.

If meat is used it may be lamb, beef, or chicken. When made of beef it is called Gosht (or Ghoust) Madras.

Accompaniments
Common accompaniments to Madras curry include raita and fresh coriander. The food of southern India is more likely to have rice as the main carbohydrate than any breads e.g. naan. Individual households will express their own traditions.

Other common variations will include brown mustard seeds which are fried till they pop, black peppercorns (a local tropical product) and vinegar as the acidulant instead of, or with, the acid fruits.

Production
The dried roasted spices may be cooked in ghee or vegetable oil and then other major fresh ingredients such as garlic and ginger are added with the vegetables and/or meat. The sweet and sour ingredients such as tamarind and lemon juice/vinegar is added later. Finally the fresh coriander is added immediately prior to serving.

Other variations may include the use of cloves, bay leaves, fenugreek and allspice.

References

Indian curries
Tamil cuisine
Spicy foods